Baqat al-Hatab is a Palestinian village in the Qalqilya Governorate in the western area of the West Bank, located 20 kilometers southwest of Nablus. According to the Palestinian Central Bureau of Statistics, the village had a population of approximately 1,748 inhabitants in 2006.

Location

History

Ottoman era
Baqat al-Hatab  was incorporated into the Ottoman Empire in 1517 with all of  Palestine, and in 1596 it appeared  in the tax registers as being in the Nahiya of Bani Sa'b of the Liwa of Nablus.  It had a population of 59 households, all Muslims. The villagers paid a fixed tax rate of 33,3% on various agricultural products, such as  wheat, barley, summer crops, goats and/or beehives,  in addition to "occasional revenues"; a total of  23,900  akçe. 5,25/24 of the revenues went to a Muslim charitable endowment.

In 1882  the PEF's  Survey of Western Palestine (SWP)  described  Baka (Beni Sab): "A well-built stone village in a conspicuous position on a bare ridge, with a few olives, and a well to the north; it is a small place. A high house on the north side formed a
trigonometrical station in 1873." It is historically the mother-village of many family hamula groups that now form the population of the Israeli township of Tira.

British Mandate era
In a 1922 census of Palestine conducted  by the British Mandate authorities, Baqa had a population of 207 Muslims, increasing in the 1931 census, when Baqa  had a population of  282 Muslims, with 63 houses.

In the   1945 statistics the population was 390 Muslims, with 8,950 dunams of land, according to an official land and population survey. Of this, 645 dunams were for plantations or irrigated land, 1,688 were for cereals, while 36 dunams were built-up land.

Jordanian era
In the wake of the 1948 Arab–Israeli War, and after the 1949 Armistice Agreements, Baqa  came  under Jordanian rule.

The Jordanian census of 1961 found 569 inhabitants in Baqa Hatab.

1967-present
Since the Six-Day War in 1967, Baqa  has been under  Israeli occupation.

After the 1995 accords, about 58.4% of the village land is defined in Area B, while the remainder 41.6%  is in Area C.

References

Bibliography

External links
Welcome To Baqat al-Hatab
Survey of Western Palestine, Map 11:    IAA, Wikimedia commons
Baqat Al Hatab (Fact Sheet), Applied Research Institute–Jerusalem (ARIJ)
Baqat al Hatab Village Profile, ARIJ
Baqat al Hatab - aerial photo, ARIJ
 Development Priorities and Needs in Baqat al Hatab, ARIJ

Qalqilya Governorate
Villages in the West Bank